Athrips maculata is a moth of the family Gelechiidae. It is found in south-eastern Kazakhstan and China (Gansu).

The wingspan is about 11 mm. The forewings are covered with light grey, black-tipped scales. There is a small black point at the base, prolonged black spot at one-third and diffused spot at two-thirds near the costal margin and a narrow oblique black strip at the base, as well as three ochreous-black spots in the middle
and paired spots surrounded by ochreous scales at two-thirds. The hindwings are light grey. Adults are on wing from May to June.

The larvae feed on Nitraria schoberi.

Etymology
The species name refers to the wing pattern and is derived from Latin macula (meaning spot).

References

Moths described in 2009
Athrips
Moths of Asia